Holocnemus hispanicus is a cellar spider species found in Spain. It belongs to the genus Holocnemus, which contains only two other species, Holocnemus caudatus and Holocnemus pluchei.

See also 
 List of Pholcidae species

References

External links 

Pholcidae
Spiders of Europe
Spiders described in 1933